A township trustee is an elected official in the local government of the U.S. state of Indiana. A township trustee administers a township, which in Indiana is the primary political subdivision of a county, and in common with most other state officials serves a term of four years.

Duties

State law requires the township trustee to perform the following duties:
Keeping a written record of official proceedings.
Managing all township property interests.
Keeping township records open for public inspection.
Attending all meetings of the township legislative body.
Receiving and paying out township funds.
Examining and settling all accounts and demands chargeable against the township.
Administering township assistance under IC 12-20 and IC 12-30-4.
Performing the duties of Fence Viewer under IC 32–26.
Providing and maintaining cemeteries under IC 23–14.
Providing fire protection under IC 36–8, except in a township that is located in a county having a consolidated city that has consolidated the township's fire department under IC 36-3-1-6.1.
Filing an annual personnel report under IC 5-11-13.
Providing and maintain township parks and community centers under IC 36–10.
Destroying detrimental plants, noxious weeds, and rank vegetation under IC 15-16-8.
Providing insulin to the poor under IC 12-20-16.
Performing other duties prescribed by statute.

Township Board
The trustee is assisted by a three-member Township Board whose members are also elected to four year terms.  Duties of the board include adopting the annual budget, serving as a board of finance and approving township contracts.  In January of each year, the trustee presents to the board an annual report showing the receipts, expenditures, investments and debts of the township. The approved report is then published in local papers for public inspection.

References

External links
 United Township Association of Indiana
 Indiana Township Association

Local government in Indiana
Indiana law